Garavaglia is a surname. Notable people with the surname include:

Adele Garavaglia (1869–1944), Italian stage and film actress
Carlo Garavaglia (born 1952), Italian association football manager
Giovita Garavaglia (1790–1835), Italian engraver
Jan Garavaglia (born 1956), American medical examiner
Jon Garavaglia (born 1974), American basketball player
Marco Garavaglia (born 1986), Italian ice dancer
Maria Pia Garavaglia (born 1947), Italian politician
Mario Garavaglia (born 1937), Argentine physicist
Massimo Garavaglia (born 1968), Italian politician